Mark Healy may refer to:

 Mark Healy (Roseanne), a character on the TV series Roseanne
 Mark Healy (Gaelic footballer) (born 1960), Irish retired Gaelic footballer

See also 
 Mark Healey, British video game developer